Massimo Maccarone (born 6 September 1979) is an Italian football coach and former player, who played as a striker. He was nicknamed Big Mac during his playing days.

He is currently in charge as head coach of Serie D amateurs Ghiviborgo.

Club career

Early career
Maccarone started his career at A.C. Milan's youth system. In 1998, he went on loan to Modena, but did not make a single appearance. In 1999, he was transferred to Serie C2 team Prato (in a co-ownership deal), scoring 20 goals in 28 league matches, finishing the season as the top scorer in the 1999–2000 Serie C2 season. In 2000, he was bought back by Milan and transferred to Empoli F.C., helping the club get promoted to Serie A during the 2001–02 season. In the same period, he was one of the most outstanding players of the Italian U21 team which reached the semi-finals in the 2002 UEFA European Under-21 Football Championship. As a result, he was noticed by several teams.

Middlesbrough
Maccarone was signed by English Premier League team Middlesbrough on 9 July 2002 for £8.15 million (€12.7 million). He made his debut against Southampton on 17 August 2002. On his second appearance and his home debut the following week he scored twice in a 2–2 draw with Fulham. Another highlight in his first season was scoring twice as Middlesbrough defeated Tottenham Hotspur 5–1.

Maccarone was an unused substitute when Middlesbrough won the 2004 Football League Cup Final. Despite showing fine early form in his first few matches for Middlesbrough, the remainder of his spell at the club was a struggle to justify his price tag and during the first half of the 2004–05 season he was loaned out to Serie A club Parma, and in January 2005 to Siena.

Maccarone returned to Middlesbrough for the 2005–06 season, and despite not being a regular first-team player, endeared himself to the Middlesbrough fans, especially through his work-rate and attitude. The player's spell at Middlesbrough is remembered for two last minute winners in key UEFA Cup ties in 2006. He scored against Basel in the second leg of the quarter-finals, a tie in which Middlesbrough overturned a three-goal deficit to win 4–3 on aggregate. In the semi-final of the same competition he came on as a substitute and scored twice in the aggregate 4–3 win over Steaua Bucharest, scoring one of Middlesbrough F.C's most iconic goals of all time, once again in the 90th minute, taking Boro to the final in Eindhoven, in which he came on as a substitute. Following his exploits in the semi-final, fellow Middlesbrough striker Jimmy Floyd Hasselbaink declared "Massimo, I love him until I die... it's unbelievable".

Siena
Despite these heroics, he made few appearances for Middlesbrough in the following season and in January 2007, Maccarone moved to Siena in a free transfer, signing a three-year contract. In February 2007, he made headlines by criticising former Middlesbrough and then-England manager Steve McClaren for his "ineptitude", causing his club's chairman Steve Gibson to call Maccarone "a fool".

On 11 February 2007, he played his first Serie A match after his Siena return, against Cagliari. Maccarone scored a brace in the 4–3 defeat against A.C. Milan on 17 February, to register his first goals for Siena. He finished the season with six goals, and added 13 in the following (club best by a long margin), as Siena achieved two consecutive 13th league places. After the club was relegated at the end of the 2009–10 season, Maccarone agreed a move to Sicilian Serie A club Palermo, signing a three-year deal with the rosanero, for €4.5 million.

Palermo
His stint at Palermo however turned out to be a disappointing one, with only two league goals in 18 games.

Sampdoria
On 24 January 2011, Maccarone signed for Sampdoria for €2.7 million on a -year contract.

Empoli
From January 2012 to June 2014 Maccarone returned to Empoli in temporary deals. His contract was also extended to 30 June 2015 in 2012. On 17 July 2014 he was allowed to join Empoli on a free transfer.

Brisbane Roar
On 17 July 2017, Maccarone signed a one-year marquee deal with A-League club Brisbane Roar.

Carrarese
On 25 May 2018, he was signed by Italian Serie C team Carrarese.

International career
During his time at Empoli, Maccarone made his debut with the Italy Under-21 side under Marco Tardelli. He later earned a place as a starting striker in Claudio Gentile's Italy Under-21 side between 2000 and 2002. In total, he scored 11 goals with the Under-21 side in 15 appearances, and he took part at the 2002 Under-21 European Championship with Italy, where he finished as the tournament's top scorer, with 3 goals, helping Italy to reach the semi-finals, where they lost out to the eventual champions, the Czech Republic. During the group stage, he scored two goals in a 2–1 win against the England Under-21 side in Basel.

In 2002, he played twice for the Italy senior side. He made his senior international debut on 27 March, in a friendly match against England in Leeds; he came on as a late substitute, with the score level at 1–1. In injury time, Maccarone was fouled in the area by the English goalkeeper David James, allowing Vincenzo Montella to score the winning goal from the penalty spot. Maccarone had scored a goal in a 1–1 friendly draw in Bradford against the England Under-21 side earlier that week. It had been over seventy years that a Serie B player had made his debut with the Italian national side before making his Serie A debut. He made his second and final appearance for the Italian senior side on 16 October 2002, in a 2–1 away defeat against Wales in a European Championship qualifying match.

Style of play
Maccarone predominantly plays as a striker, although he is also capable of being deployed as a supporting forward or as a winger, where he is able to move into the centre of the pitch and curl shots towards goal with his stronger foot, due to his striking ability from distance, and his eye for goal. Maccarone is capable of shooting with either foot, and he possesses good tactical intelligence, pace, and technique, as well as a strong mentality and good composure in front of goal; morehowever, he is effective in the air.

Coaching career
Following his retirement, he stayed on at Carrarese as a technical collaborator under his former boss Silvio Baldini for the 2020–21 season, leaving in April 2021 following the appointment of Antonio Di Natale as the club's new head coach.

In June 2022, Maccarone took on his first role as head coach, accepting a job offer from Tuscan Serie D amateurs Ghiviborgo.

Career statistics

Club

Honours

Club
Middlesbrough
Football League Cup: 2003–04
UEFA Cup runner-up: 2005–06

Individual
UEFA European Under-21 Championship Top-scorer: 2002

References

External links

FIGC national team stats 

1979 births
Living people
Sportspeople from the Province of Novara
Italian footballers
Italy international footballers
Italy youth international footballers
Italy under-21 international footballers
Italian expatriate footballers
A.C. Milan players
Brisbane Roar FC players
Empoli F.C. players
Modena F.C. players
Middlesbrough F.C. players
Parma Calcio 1913 players
A.C.N. Siena 1904 players
S.S.D. Varese Calcio players
A.C. Prato players
Palermo F.C. players
U.C. Sampdoria players
Carrarese Calcio players
Serie A players
Serie B players
Serie C players
Premier League players
A-League Men players
Association football forwards
Italian expatriate sportspeople in England
Expatriate footballers in England
Expatriate soccer players in Australia
Marquee players (A-League Men)
Italian expatriate sportspeople in Australia
Footballers from Piedmont